Boarding school is an educational institution.

Boarding School may also refer to:

Film
Passion Flower Hotel (film), a 1978 film that is titled Boarding School in some regions
Boarding School (2018 film), a horror film by Boaz Yakin

See also
The Boarding School (disambiguation)